Georges Miez (2 October 1904 – 21 April 1999) was a Swiss gymnast. He competed at the 1924, 1928, 1932 and 1936 Summer Olympics, winning a total of four gold, three silver and one bronze medals. Miez was the most successful athlete of the 1928 Games, whereas in 1932 he was the only medalist for Switzerland. Miez also won three medals at the 1934 World Championships.

Between the 1924 and 1928 Olympics Miez served in the Swiss army, coached gymnastics in the Netherlands, and worked for a Swiss sportswear company, where he designed a new type of gymnastics trousers. After that he coached gymnastics in Chiasso. Switzerland did not send an Olympic team in 1932 due to the economic depression, but Miez volunteered to compete on his own, and also return the body of his brother who died in the United States. After winning a silver on the floor, Miez withdrew from the Games and toured the United States giving presentations at universities.

Miez retired after the 1936 Games and worked as a national gymnastics coach and then as a Red Cross official. After World War II he founded several private schools, wrote books on sports medicine, and coached tennis. He spent most of his late years in Lugano, where he died of a stroke aged 94.

See also
List of multiple Olympic gold medalists
List of multiple Summer Olympic medalists

References

External links 
 

1904 births
1999 deaths
Swiss male artistic gymnasts
Gymnasts at the 1924 Summer Olympics
Gymnasts at the 1928 Summer Olympics
Gymnasts at the 1932 Summer Olympics
Gymnasts at the 1936 Summer Olympics
Olympic gymnasts of Switzerland
Olympic gold medalists for Switzerland
Olympic silver medalists for Switzerland
Olympic bronze medalists for Switzerland
Olympic medalists in gymnastics
Medalists at the 1936 Summer Olympics
Medalists at the 1932 Summer Olympics
Medalists at the 1928 Summer Olympics
Medalists at the 1924 Summer Olympics
Medalists at the World Artistic Gymnastics Championships
Sportspeople from Lugano